The following is a List of poems by Robert Frost. Robert Frost was an American poet, and the recipient of four Pulitzer Prizes for poetry.

Collections

A Boy's Will (1913)

North of Boston (1914)

Mountain Interval (1916)
The following list is compiled from the revised 1920 edition:

New Hampshire (1923)
Stopping by Woods on a Snowy Evening
Fire and Ice
The Aim Was Song
The Need of Being Versed in Country Things
I Will Sing You One O
Paul's Wife
For Once, Then, Something
The Onset
Two Look at Two
Nothing Gold Can Stay
New Hampshire
Misgiving
The Axe-Helve
The Grind-Stone
The Witch of Coos
The Pauper Witch of Grafton
A Star In A Stone Boat
The Star Splitter
In A Disused Graveyard
Fragmentary Blue
A Brook in the City
On a Tree Fallen Across the Road (To Hear Us Talk)
 Gathering Leaves
 To Earthward

West-Running Brook (1928)

A Further Range (1937)

A Witness Tree (1942)

The Gift Outright
The Most of It
Come In
All Revelation
A Considerable Speck
The Silken Tent
Happiness Makes Up In Height For What It Lacks In Length
The Subverted Flower
The Lesson for Today
The Discovery of the Madeiras
Of the Stones of the Place
Never Again Would Birds' Song Be the Same
To A Moth Seen In Winter

In the Clearing (1962)
Pod of the Milkweed
Away!
A Cabin in the Clearing
Closed for Good
America is Hard to See
One More Brevity
Escapist—Never
For John F. Kennedy His Inauguration
Accidentally on Purpose
A Never Naught Song
Version
A Concept Self-Conceived
Forgive O, Lord
Kitty Hawk
Auspex
The Draft Horse
Ends
Peril of Hope
Questioning Faces
Does No One at All Ever Feel This Way in the Least?
The Bad Island—Easter
Our Doom to Bloom
The Objection to Being Stepped on
A Wishing Well
How Hard Is It to Keep from Being King When It's in You and in the Situation
Lines Written in Dejection on the Eve of a Great Success
The Milky Way Is a Cowpath
Some Science Fiction
Quandary
A Reflex
In a Glass of Cider
From Iron
Four-Room Shack
But Outer Space
On Being Chosen Poet of Vermont
We Vainly Wrestle
It Takes All Sorts
In Winter in the Woods

Steeple Bush (1947)
Directive
Skeptic
Etherealizing
Why Wait for Science
An Unstamped Letter in Our Rural Letter Box (1944).

An Afterword
Choose Something Like a Star
Dust of snow 
The road not taken

References

Frost, Robert
 
Robert Frost